James Fairlie (born 2 August 1957) is a Scottish former footballer.

Family

Fairlie's brother Brian also played senior football, with Albion Rovers.

His daughter Susan Fairlie played football for Hamilton Accies' women's section and was named SWFA Player of the Year in 2010. A police officer, she signed for Celtic in 2011 but returned to Accies during the Scottish Women's Premier League mid–season break.

References

External links

1957 births
People from Baillieston
Hamilton Academical F.C. players
Scottish footballers
Association football forwards
Living people
Footballers from Glasgow
Scottish Football League players
Scottish Junior Football Association players
Clydebank F.C. (1965) players
Motherwell F.C. players
Airdrieonians F.C. (1878) players
Clyde F.C. players
Livingston United F.C. players
Association football midfielders